Crarae is a settlement in Argyll and Bute, Scotland, on the shore of Loch Fyne. It lies on the A83, north of Lochgilphead.

The location is known for the Crarae Gardens, a Himalayan botanical garden created by Lady Grace Campbell, now run by the National Trust for Scotland. The garden begun in 1912 and was supported by the Campbell family until 2001, when financial troubles caused the garden to close, seeing it purchased by the National Trust and reopened a year later.

References

Geography of Argyll and Bute